Dickel is a surname. People with the surname include:

 Carlson Dickel (born 1946), New Zealand cricket player
 Dan Dickel (born 1952), American football player
 Friedrich Dickel (1913–1993), East German politician
 George A. Dickel (1818–1894), German-born American businessman
 Gerhard Dickel (1913–2017), German chemist and physicist
 Mark Dickel (born 1976), New Zealand-Australian basketball player and coach
 Norbert Dickel (born 1961), German football player
 Otto Dickel (1880–1944), German politician
 Richard Dickel, New Zealand basketball coach
 Thomas Dickel (1897–1969), New Zealand cricket player

See also
 Dickel (disambiguation)

Surnames of German origin